Barnsley Academy is a secondary school in Barnsley, South Yorkshire, England. The school opened in September 2006.

The school has academy status, sponsored by United Learning.

Ofsted judgements

As of 2021, the school's most recent inspection by Ofsted was in 2020, with a judgement of Good.

References

External links 
School Homepage

Academies in Barnsley
Secondary schools in Barnsley
United Learning schools
2006 establishments in England
Educational institutions established in 2006